The 2019 Idaho Vandals football team represented the University of Idaho in the 2019 NCAA Division I FCS football season. The Vandals played their home games on campus at the Kibbie Dome in Moscow, Idaho, and were members of the Big Sky Conference. They were led by seventh-year head coach Paul Petrino. They finished the season 5–7, 3–5 in Big Sky play to finish in a three-way tie for sixth place.

Previous season 
The Vandals finished the 2018 season 4–7, 3–5 in Big Sky Conference.

Preseason

Big Sky preseason poll
The Big Sky released their preseason media and coaches' polls on July 15, 2019. The Vandals were picked to finish in eighth place in both polls.

Preseason All–Big Sky team
The Vandals had two players selected to the preseason all-Big Sky team.

Offense – Noah Johnson – GuardSpecial teams – Cade Coffey – Punter

Schedule

The Eastern Washington game was designated by the Big Sky as a non-conference game.

Roster

Position key

Game summaries

at Penn State

Central Washington

at Wyoming

Eastern Washington

at Northern Colorado

Weber State

at Portland State

Idaho was shut out by a Big Sky opponent for only the second time (1986) in over thirty years of league play.

Idaho State

Cal Poly

at Montana

Sacramento State

at Northern Arizona

Ranking movements

NFL draft

No Vandals were selected in the 2020 NFL Draft. Jake Luton of Oregon State, a Vandal quarterback as a redshirt freshman in 2015, was taken by the Jacksonville Jaguars in the sixth round, 189th overall.

List of Idaho Vandals in the NFL Draft

References

Idaho
Idaho Vandals football seasons
Idaho Vandals football